Sisport is a women's basketball team during the 1970s and 1980s in Turin, Italy.

History
Gruppo Sportivo FIAT (G.S. FIAT) was founded in 1922 by employees of the eponymous automobile manufacturer the city of Turin is still associated with. Since 1978, it has first known as Sisport Fiat and then simply as Sisport. The club now primarily supports amateur and youth sports due to the emergence of professionalism in various sports.

Sports
Athletics
Football (youth only)
Rowing
Rugby
Swimming

Women's Basketball

FIAT has won Euroleague Women in the 1979–80 season and two Italian Championships.

Titles
 1 Euroleague Women (1980)
 5 Italian Championships - Lega Basket Femminile (1962, 1963, 1964, 1979, 1980)

Athletics
Notable former athletes include racewalker champion Ileana Salvador, Mediterranean Games gold medalist Marisa Masullo, and the four Olympic gold medalists Pietro Mennea, Sara Simeoni, Maurizio Damilano and Gabriella Dorio (in that period under the administration of Giampiero Boniperti and the sponsorship of Fiat Iveco).

Titles
 1 European Champion Clubs Cup (1993)

Honors
Medaglia d'Onore al merito sportivo (Medal of Honor for Sporting Merit): 1963, 2009

Notable athletes
Alessio Boggiatto, World Aquatics Championships gold medalist
Chiara Boggiatto, swimmer and Mediterranean Games gold medalist
Lorenzo Calafiore, wrestler and Mediterranean Games gold medalist
Claudio Marchisio, footballer for Juventus F.C. and Italy national football team (played some of his youth football at Sisport)

References

External links
Official Website

Women's basketball teams in Italy
EuroLeague Women clubs
Sport in Turin
Basketball teams established in 1922
Athletics clubs in Italy